Étainhus is a commune in the Seine-Maritime department in the Normandy region in northern France.

Heraldry

Geography

Population

Places of interest
 The church of St. Jacques, dating from the eleventh century.

See also
 Tramway de Saint-Romain-de-Colbosc
 Communes of the Seine-Maritime department

References

Communes of Seine-Maritime